Eskişehir railway station is the main railway station in Eskişehir, Turkey. The station is part of a major railway facility, which is one of the largest in the country. Prior to the cancellation of all non-high-speed trains between Ankara and Istanbul, Eskişehir station was one of the busiest stations in Turkey. Eskişehir is served by high-speed trains on the Ankara–Istanbul line. Due to its geographical location, the city is an important railway junction, where two main lines meet. The largest railway factory in Turkey, owned by TÜLOMSAŞ, is located next to the station as well as serving as the headquarters for the company.

Eskişehir railway station is located towards the northwestern part of the city center. Estram tram lines serve the station with a direct link the heart of the cities as well as the main north and south districts.

The station was built in 1891 by the Anatolian Railway and officially opened on 31 December 1892.

History

Railways came to Eskişehir in 1892, when the Anatolian Railway (CFOA) built its İstanbul-Ankara rail line, which passed through the city. The station opened on December 31, 1892 along with the entire line. Since Eskişehir was a town, whose industry was reliant on farming, growth of the town was limited. However, when the CFOA started construction of their mainline to Konya in 1893, the town was to become an important railway junction. During the construction, the CFOA opened a Locomotive maintenance facility in 1894, which would later become TÜLOMSAŞ. When the line to Konya was opened in 1896, industrialization of the town began. During the Turkish War of Independence, in 1919, the station facilities were used as a base for Turkish nationalist forces. In 1920, the station was taken over by the Greek Army only to be taken back by the Turks in 1922.

The war ended in 1923, but the CFOA was in bad shape due to heavy damage to the rails and locomotives. Shortly after the war, the locomotive maintenance facility was expanded to help the reconstruction of the line. A factory to build new locomotives and railcars as well as another factory to build switches and many personnel faculties were built, with funding from the new Turkish government. After World War II, a new grain elevator was built, which increased the growth of the town to a city. On June 19, 1953 construction of the present day station building started. The building was designed by Orhan Safa and cost 1,780,000 Turkish lira. The building was inaugurated on November 4, 1955, by Yümmü Üresin, the Minister of Transport. In the 1960s, the railway facilities were at their heyday constructing new locomotives at a heavy rate. In the 1990s, most of the facilities production declined and some were abandoned by 2000. In 2007, a plan to rebuild the station underground to open up traffic was concluded and construction started shortly after, despite heavy criticism. After a plan to demolish the main building, many railway workers protested against it and the station was then put under special protection as a historical building. Construction is planned to end in 2013.

Current Operations

Eskişehir today is an important station on the İstanbul-Ankara main line.  It is visited by 16 intercity trains running between İstanbul and Ankara, 4 intercity trains between İzmir and Ankara, 20 Yüksek Hızlı Tren high-speed trains to Ankara, and 8 intercity trains to İstanbul.

Connections to city buses are available outside the station building as well as connections to the citywide tram system.

Gallery

See also
Enveriye station — another station in the city served by mainline trains

References

External links
Ankara Eskişehir Hızlı Tren Saatleri (Turkish)
eskişehir tren garı (Turkish)
istanbul eskişehir hızlı tren

Railway stations in Eskişehir Province
1892 establishments in the Ottoman Empire
Buildings and structures in Eskişehir
Railway stations opened in 1892
Transport in Eskişehir Province
Eskişehir
High-speed railway stations in Turkey